John South may refer to:
 John South (footballer, born 1952) (1952–2004), English footballer for Colchester United
 John South (footballer, born 1948), English footballer for Brentford
 John Flint South (1797–1882), English surgeon